Julio Estuardo Girón Rafael (born March 2, 1970) is a retired Guatemalan football midfielder. He played several years for Aurora F.C. and CSD Municipal before retiring at Deportivo Petapa in January 2008.

International career
Girón made his debut for Guatemala in a June 1992 friendly match against Nicaragua and played in three different World Cup qualification campaigns.

He earned 82 caps, in which he never scored a goal. In 1999, he became Guatemala's most capped player of all time, before he was surpassed by Edgar Estrada three years later.
His final international game was a February 2006 friendly match against the United States.

External links

References

1970 births
Living people
Sportspeople from Guatemala City
Guatemalan footballers
Guatemala international footballers
1996 CONCACAF Gold Cup players
1998 CONCACAF Gold Cup players
2000 CONCACAF Gold Cup players
Aurora F.C. players
C.S.D. Municipal players
Association football midfielders
Deportivo Petapa players